Riccardo Bertazzolo (4 July 1903 – 5 March 1975) was an Italian boxer who competed in the 1924 Summer Olympics. He was born in Venice. In 1924 he was eliminated in the quarterfinals of the heavyweight class after losing to the upcoming gold medalist Otto von Porat.

References

External links
 
 Italian Olympians BERO-BERTE 

1903 births
1975 deaths
Sportspeople from Venice
Heavyweight boxers
Olympic boxers of Italy
Boxers at the 1924 Summer Olympics
Italian male boxers
20th-century Italian people